USS Curlew may refer to one of four ships of the United States Navy named for the Curlew:

 , merchant propeller steamer, Union Navy gunboat and USQMD transport, referred to as USS Curlew in some dispatches.
 , a Union Navy stern-wheel steamer, that was built in 1862 at Pittsburgh.
 , a Lapwing-class minesweeper.
 , a Catbird-class minesweeper.
 , formerly YMS-218, a motor minesweeper.

See also
 , a fishery vessel in the fleet of the United States Bureau of Fisheries

Sources
 

United States Navy ship names